baloisedirect.ch, was part of the Bâloise Group until May 2018, selling insurance directly to consumers online. In 2013, Bâloise reportedly generated 12% of all its new auto insurance contracts via baloisedirect.ch. Today the Swiss entity of Bâloise Group sells its products through baloise.ch and its sales agents.

History
On 3. September 2007, baloisedirect.ch was launched as Bâloise Group's online insurance provider, offering insurance for vehicles, personal liability insurance, home contents insurance, legal expenses insurance and travel insurance. The site was taken offline on May 15th 2018 and integrated into baloise.ch.

References

External links
 Official website of baloisedirect.ch

Financial services companies established in 2007
Insurance companies of Switzerland
Online insurance companies